The 1979 South Australian National Football League season was the 100th season of the top-level Australian rules football competition in South Australia.

The final five was Central Districts, Port Adelaide, South Adelaide, Norwood and Woodville. Woodville was competing in the finals for the first time, but lost the Elimination Final to Norwood. Central Districts won their first minor premiership, but lost both its finals, first to Port then to South.

Ladder

Finals series

Grand Final

References 

SANFL
South Australian National Football League seasons